Sukbok Chang (장석복; born August 1, 1962) is a South Korean organic chemist. He is a distinguished professor in the Department of Chemistry at Korea Advanced Institute of Science and Technology (KAIST). He is also the director of the Institute for Basic Science (IBS) Center for Catalytic Hydrocarbon Functionalizations (CCHF). He was an associate editor on ACS Catalysis and has served on the editorial advisory boards of The Journal of Organic Chemistry, Journal of the American Chemical Society, and Accounts of Chemical Research. His major research interest is transition metal catalyzed C-H bond functionalization for the carbon-carbon bond and carbon-heteroatom bond formation.

Career 
Sukbok Chang received his B.S degree from Korea University in 1985, and M.S degree from KAIST in 1987. Then, he joined Eric N. Jacobsen’s group and received his PhD in 1996 at Harvard University. He subsequently worked with Robert H. Grubbs at Caltech as a postdoctoral fellow from 1996 to 1998. In early 1998, he joined the faculty of Ewha Womans University as an assistant professor, and moved to KAIST as a full professor in 2002. In 2012, he was selected as a director of the Center for Catalytic Hydrocarbon Functionalizations at the Institute for Basic Science, which is the biggest Korean government funded research institute. He also has been working as an associate editor of the journal ACS Catalysis since 2015. In 2023, he was selected to co-run the KAIST Cross Generation Creation Lab, a laboratory designed to continue the know-how of professors about to retire through collaboration with younger professors.

Major contributions 
Chang’s group studies new organic reactions and mechanisms with transition metal catalysis. In particular, his group contributed to the development of “copper catalyzed multicomponent coupling” in the 2000s. Since 2008, his group has focused on C-H functionalization and made a number of contributions.

Copper-catalyzed multicomponent coupling 

Cu-catalyzed multicomponent coupling is a notable process developed by Chang's group. In 2005, they published a highly efficient and mild catalytic three component coupling between an alkyne, sulfonyl azide, and amine. Unlike click chemistry which generates 1,4-triazoles as products, in this case a Cu(I) catalyst, sulfonyl azide and alkyne generate ketenimine intermediate after releasing N2 gas. This electrophilic ketenimine intermediate reacts with amines and to generate asymmetric imines as products. Chang's group also showed water, alcohols, the C3 position of pyrrole and other nucleophiles can be used in this reaction.

Rhodium, Iridium-catalyzed C-N bond formation 

Rhodium or iridium catalyzed C-H amidation and amination are other achievements of his group. In 2012, his group published rhodium catalyzed intermolecular amidation of arenes using sulfonyl azide as a nitrene precursor. This reaction generates N2 as the single byproduct, doesn't need external oxidant, has broad substrate scope and high functional group tolerance. Chang's group advanced their work by using different directing groups, different azides and various substrates. They also published that iridium also works well for C-H amidation/amination.

In 2016, Chang's group discovered new nitrogen sources. Their new nitrene precursor, 1,4,2-dioxazol-5-one, is more convenient to prepare, store and use compared to azides. Moreover, it has a strong affinity to the rhodium or Iridium metal center, and thus gives excellent amidation efficiency. They later published selective formation of gamma-lactams via C-H amidation with this type of nucleophile.

Honors and awards
 2022: Ho-Am Prize in Science
 2019: Korea Best Scientist and Engineer Award, Korean Federation of Science and Technology Societies
 2018: Korea Toray Science Award, Korea Toray Science Foundation
 2018: JSPS Invitational Fellowship, Japan Society for the Promotion of Science
 2018: Grand Academic Research Award, KAIST
 2017: 1st ACS-KCS Excellence Award, American Chemical Society and Korean Chemical Society
 2017: Humboldt Research Award, Alexander von Humboldt Foundation
 2016: Yoshida Prize, International Organic Chemistry Foundation
 2015-2020: Highly Cited Researcher in chemistry, Clarivate Analytics
 2015: Knowledge Creation Award, Ministry of Science, ICT and Future Planning
 2014: Member of the Korean Academy of Science and Technology
 2013: Korea Science Award
 2013: Kyung-Ahm Prize, Kyung-Ahm Education & Cultural Foundation
 2010: KCS Academic Award, Korean Chemical Society
 2008: Star Faculty, Korea Research Foundation
 2006: One of 50 Representative Research Performances, Korea Science & Engineering Foundation
 2005: Shim Sang Cheol Award, Korean Chemical Society
 2003: Thieme Journals Award, Synlett/Synthesis Professorship Award in Asian Area
 2002: Young Chemist Award, Korean Chemical Society sponsored by WILEY

References

External links
 Sukbok Chang - Google Scholar

1962 births
Living people
Academic staff of Ewha Womans University
Harvard University alumni
KAIST alumni
Academic staff of KAIST
Korea University alumni
Organic chemists
Institute for Basic Science
South Korean chemists
Recipients of the Ho-Am Prize in Science